Amata expandens  is a species of moth of the family Erebidae first described by Francis Walker in 1862. It is found in Sundaland. The habitat consists of lowland areas.

References 

expand
Moths of Africa
Moths described in 1862